The , signed as Route K3, is one of the tolled routes of the Shuto Expressway system serving the Greater Tokyo Area and is one of seven of the routes in the system serving Kanagawa Prefecture. Alongside the Yokohama Yokosuka Road, it connects central Yokohama to the Tōmei Expressway and the Bayshore Route which, in turn, connect to the rest of the Greater Tokyo Area and points beyond.

Route description
Route K3 begins at Honmoku Junction in Naka-ku traveling west to central Yokohama from the Bayshore Route. From this eastern terminus, it travels west through central Yokohama as an elevated highway over the Nakamura River. At Ishikawachō Junction it has an interchange with the southern terminus of the Yokohane Route. Continuing west the expressway enters Minami-ku, where it has some junctions with various municipal and prefecture roads. At Hanaoki, the Kariba Route leaves the Nakamura River curving to the northwest, eventually entering  Hodogaya-ku. In this ward  Route K3 meets its western terminus at Kariba Junction where it merges into the Yokohama Yokosuka Road and the Yokohama Shindō.

The speed limit along almost the first  of the Kariba Route from the Bayshore Route to Hanaoki is set at 50 km/h. The remainder of the route between Hananoki and the route's western terminus at Kariba Junction has a speed limit that is increased to 60 km/h.

History
The first section of the Kariba Route was opened to traffic on 2 February 1984 between the interchanges at Shin-yamashita and Yokohama-kōen. The expressway was extended direction to its eastern terminus at Honmoku Junction where it meets the Bayshore Route on 27 September 1987 upon the completion of the Yokohama Bay Bridge along the Bayhore Route. Next, it was extended west to Kariba Junction, the expressway's western terminus, on 20 March 1990.

Junction list
The entire expressway lies within Yokohama in Kanagawa Prefecture

See also

References

External links

K3
1984 establishments in Japan
Roads in Kanagawa Prefecture